Thomas Kenneth Bayley (25 June 1921 – 1996) was an English professional footballer who played as a goalkeeper. He made appearances in the English Football League for Wrexham and also played for Darlaston Town.

Bayley also guested for Walsall during the Second World War.

References

1921 births
1996 deaths
English footballers
Association football goalkeepers
Walsall F.C. wartime guest players
Wrexham A.F.C. players
Darlaston Town F.C. players
English Football League players
Sportspeople from Wednesbury